The Freedom Convoy class action lawsuit is a class action lawsuit against various Canada convoy protestors.

Lawsuit
The Freedom Convoy class action lawsuit is a $306 million class action lawsuit against various Canada convoy protestors led by Ottawa lawyer Paul Champ.

Claim
The lawsuit's website states that: "The defendants deliberately planned and co-ordinated tactics to block all the streets and roadways around Parliament Hill and the surrounding neighborhoods, and to make as much noise and air pollution as possible to cause discomfort and distress to Ottawa residents, business and workers to coerce governments to comply with their demands,” and that  “The non-stop blaring horns, diesel fumes, unexpected fireworks and loud sound systems blasting music have caused the residents unbearable torment in the sanctity of their own homes."

Parties

Plaintiffs
Named plaintiffs to the class action lawsuit are Ottawa residents Zexi Li, restauranteur Henry Assad, Ivan Gedz of Union Local 613, and restaurant staffer Geoffrey Devaney. Additional participants include hundreds of businesses and thousands of restaurants.

Defendants
Defendants named in the lawsuit include protestor organizer Benjamin Dichter, Chris Barber, Tamara Lich, Patrick King, James Bauder, and Tom Marazzo  On February 17, 2022, 31 additional defendants were added. In December 2022, Paul Champ applied to Ontario's Superior Court of Justice to add additional representative defendants to the lawsuits. The additional defendants were:

 GiveSendGo Christian crowdfunding website and the website's founder Jacob Wells
 West Lincoln town councilor and truck driver Harold Jonker, who claimed to be the first truck driver to park a big rig in Ottawa.
 Businessman Brad Howland of New Brunswick who donated US$75,000 to the convoy.

See also 

 List of class-action lawsuits
 Royal Bank of Canada class-action lawsuit

References

External links
 Official website

2022 in Canadian case law
Class action case law in Canada
Canada convoy protest